Methylmercuric dicyanamide is a chemical compound used as a fungicide for crops such as cereals, cotton, flax, sorghum, and sugar beets. As of 1998, the U.S. Environmental Protection Agency listed it as an unregistered pesticide in the United States. Although named as a dicyanamide, the major organic structure is a 2-cyanoguanidino group.

References

Cyanamides
Mercury(II) compounds